Bara is a district of North Kordofan state, Sudan.

References

Districts of Sudan